Diogo Luís Santo (born 26 May 1987), known simply as Diogo, is a Brazilian professional footballer who plays as a striker for Malaysia Super League club Johor Darul Ta'zim.

After starting out at Portuguesa, he spent most of his career in the Super League Greece with Olympiacos – having signed in 2008 – and in the Thai League 1 with Buriram United.

Club career

Brazil
Born in São Paulo, Diogo started his football career at Associação Portuguesa de Desportos. He quickly made a name for himself at the club, breaking into the first team in 2007 and contributing largely to a promotion to the Série A, scoring 18 goals in 28 games – season's best – and being voted the competition's best player.

It was this form which initially prompted Brazilian under-20 coach Nélson Rodrigues to include Diogo in his team (he had already played in previous national youth sides). In 2008 he had his first taste of top-flight football with Portuguesa, and showed early good form with six goals in 13 matches. Early in the same year, president Manuel da Lupa said he was as good as if not better than A.C. Milan's teenage sensation Alexandre Pato; he added that the player had only shown 50% of his capability due to consistent injuries.

In July 2008, several teams had been attracted to Diogo's talents, and the player revealed his desire to play his trade in Europe after longtime admirers Arsenal were joined by ACF Fiorentina in bidding for his services. He had been monitored by the former's scouting department for more than two years, and offers included a £9,000,000 one, promptly rejected by Portuguesa; Arsenal manager Arsène Wenger also publicly stated that he had tried to sign him once, as a 16-year-old.

Olympiacos
Olympiacos F.C. also became interested and, in a widely documented and somewhat controversial period of negotiation, Diogo finally signed for the Greek club in August 2008, for €9 million and 70% of the player's rights. After passing his medical, he agreed to a five-year contract.

Diogo made his first appearance in the season's opener, against Asteras Tripolis F.C. on 30 August 2008. On 6 September he scored from the penalty spot against Ionikos FC, in a friendly. In the second round, he netted the game's only goal at Skoda Xanthi FC. During his first campaign he also showcased his good heading ability by scoring many of his goals from headers, being at one point the player with more goals with that specific body part at four.

In that year's UEFA Cup, Diogo scored twice in the 5–0 home victory over FC Nordsjælland on 2 October, adding two more in a 5–1 defeat of S.L. Benfica the following month, also in the group stage and at Karaiskakis Stadium. Hence, heightened rumours of a big-money transfer to Europe's elite – and again to England – surfaced, whilst the player was ranked seventh (out of 50) in The Daily Telegraph's list of Footballers Transfer Target List; eventually, the Piraeus team won the double.

Further interest arose in October 2008, now from three other Premier League sides, Middlesbrough, Chelsea and Liverpool. The latter's coach, Rafa Benítez, again declared interest in the player in March of the following year, preparing to offer £12 million to acquire his services. Anfield scouts had been said to have checked on him, seeing him as a perfect replacement for the departed Robbie Keane; Benítez then loaned Sebastián Leto to Olympiacos, further fueling rumours that the player would be included in a swap deal, but nothing came to fruition, with Leto instead moving to Panathinaikos FC.

Diogo's second season was disastrous for both him and the team, suffering several injuries which limited to just slightly more than half of the games, scoring just two goals and losing his place in the starting lineup to Kostantinos Mitroglou. He started 2010–11 by netting twice against Besa Kavajë of Albania in a 5–0 away win (11–1 on aggregate) in the Europa League. In the competition's next round, however, against Maccabi Tel Aviv FC, he was sent off after punching opposing goalkeeper Liran Strauber, in a 1–0 away loss that also meant the Greeks' elimination on the away goals rule.

Back to Brazil
Diogo returned to Brazil on 19 August 2010, being loaned to CR Flamengo. Six months later, he joined Santos FC also on loan, failing to perform overall and returning to Olympiakos in January 2012, being excluded from the squad later that year.

On 6 March 2013, Diogo returned to his first club Portuguesa.

Buriram United
On 31 December 2014, Diogo signed a two-year contract with Buriram United F.C. from the Thai Premier League. He scored in his debut on 24 January 2015, helping his new team to defeat Bangkok Glass F.C. 1–0 in the Kor Royal Cup.

Diogo scored 45 goals in 51 competitive games in his first season, as Buriram became the first Asian side to win five titles in one year.

Johor Darul Ta'zim
On 3 January 2019, Johor Darul Ta'zim F.C. announced the signing of Diogo for an approximate fee of €1.5 million, the highest ever paid by a Malaysian club.

Club statistics

Honours
Olympiacos
Super League Greece: 2008–09, 2011–12, 2012–13
Greek Football Cup: 2008–09, 2011–12

Santos
Campeonato Paulista: 2011
Copa Libertadores: 2011

Buriram United
Thai League 1: 2015, 2017, 2018
Thai FA Cup: 2015
Thai League Cup: 2015, 2016
Thailand Champions Cup: 2015, 2016
Mekong Club Championship: 2015, 2016
Toyota Premier Cup: 2016

Johor Darul Ta'zim
Malaysia Super League: 2019, 2020
Malaysia Cup: 2019
Piala Sumbangsih: 2019, 2020

BG Pathum United
Thai League 1: 2020–21
Thailand Champions Cup: 2021, 2022

Individual
Thai League 1 Top Scorer/MVP: 2015, 2018
Best Foreign Player – Malaysia National Football Awards: 2019

References

External links

1987 births
Living people
Brazilian footballers
Footballers from São Paulo
Association football forwards
Campeonato Brasileiro Série A players
Associação Portuguesa de Desportos players
CR Flamengo footballers
Santos FC players
Sociedade Esportiva Palmeiras players
Super League Greece players
Olympiacos F.C. players
Thai League 1 players
Buriram United F.C. players
BG Pathum United F.C. players
Malaysia Super League players
Johor Darul Ta'zim F.C. players
Brazilian expatriate footballers
Expatriate footballers in Greece
Expatriate footballers in Thailand
Expatriate footballers in Malaysia
Brazilian expatriate sportspeople in Greece
Brazilian expatriate sportspeople in Thailand
Brazilian expatriate sportspeople in Malaysia